Just Add Water is the third studio album by American rapper Suga Free. It was released on May 9, 2006 through Laneway/Bungalo Records. Production was handled by Ricky "Freeze" Smith, J. Classic, Big Saccs, Kenny McCloud, Blaqthoven, Poochie Ross, Josef Leimberg, J. Steez, Daisuke Miyachi and Mannie Fresh. It features guest appearances from Blaqthoven, Katt Williams, Infra-Red, Snoop Dogg, Asami Yoshida, Cody Elles, Debra Edwards, Jeff Jeff, Klu Dogg, Knoc-turn'al, Kokane, Lil' ½ Dead, Marlon, Mike Mike, Mr. Short Khop and Strange. It peaked at number 194 on the US Billboard 200 and at number 42 on the Top R&B/Hip-Hop Albums.

Critical reception
Quentin B. Huff of PopMatters praised the album, writing that "its humor and musicianship represent the best of the West Coast while taking an expansive approach to making music that goes beyond its genre". The Chicago Tribune called the album "a fascinating, always entertaining, and even enlightening piece of work".

Track listing

Charts

References

External links

2006 albums
Suga Free albums
Albums produced by Mannie Fresh